Pentagonaster is a genus of sea stars in the family Goniasteridae.

Species list
Many species previously in the genus have been assigned to other genera in the subfamily, some also have been absorbed into the following species:

References

Goniasteridae